The Aero 3s is a re-bodied and more aerodynamic version of the Campagna T-Rex. It was introduced by Anibal Automotive Design of Canada in 2006. The new body incorporates some features not seen on the T-Rex, such as Lamborghini-style opening scissor doors, side windows, and "an array of phantasmogorical spoilers". The full fibreglass body kit (unpainted) retails at $8,500 USD as of 2018, to which must be added the cost of the host T-Rex.

The body was designed by Hani Harouche, who explains that "I called it the Aero 3S, aero for the more aerodynamic shape [than the T-Rex], and 3S for the three seasons you can actually drive it [in Canada]."

References

Citations

Bibliography

External links
Official web site
Walkaround video of the Aero 3S

Three-wheeled motor vehicles
Cars introduced in 2006